Queen's or Queens University may refer to:

Queen's University at Kingston, Ontario, Canada
Queen's University Belfast, Northern Ireland, UK
Queen's University of Belfast (UK Parliament constituency) (1918–1950)
Queen's University of Belfast (Northern Ireland Parliament constituency) (1921–1969)
Queen's University Belfast A.F.C.
Queen's University of Ireland (1850–1882)
Queens University of Charlotte, North Carolina, United States
Queens University (Bangladesh) in Dhaka

See also 
 Queen's College (disambiguation)
 Queen's campus (disambiguation)
 Queens (disambiguation) (including "Queen's")